Sirohydrochlorin is a tetrapyrrole macrocyclic metabolic intermediate in the biosynthesis of sirohaem, the iron-containing prosthetic group in sulfite reductase enzymes. It is also the biosynthetic precursor to cofactor F430, an enzyme which catalyzes the release of methane in the final step of methanogenesis.

Structure
Sirohydrochlorin was first isolated in the early 1970s when it was shown to be the metal-free form of the prosthetic group in the ferredoxin-nitrite reductase from spinach. Its chemical identity was established by spectroscopy and by total synthesis.

Biosynthesis
Sirohydrochlorin is derived from a tetrapyrrolic structural framework created by the enzymes deaminase and cosynthetase which transform aminolevulinic acid via porphobilinogen and hydroxymethylbilane to uroporphyrinogen III. The latter is the first macrocyclic intermediate common to haem, chlorophyll, sirohaem and vitamin B12. Uroporphyrinogen III is subsequently transformed by the addition of two methyl groups to form dihydrosirohydrochlorin and this is oxidised by precorrin-2 dehydrogenase to give sirohydrochlorin.

See also
Sirohydrochlorin ferrochelatase an enzyme that catalyzes insertion of iron to form siroheme.
Sirohydrochlorin cobaltochelatase an enzyme that catalyzes insertion of cobalt.

References

Tetrapyrroles